Doumbi Fakoly (born January 1, 1944) is a Malian writer.

Biography
Born in 1944 in Kita, Mali, Doumbi Fakoly spent his childhood in Senegal. He went on to study in France, where he obtained a degree in banking (French: Diplôme d'étude supérieures en banques). From 1978 to 1980, he worked for Banque Meridien Biao Mali.

In 1983, he published his first book, They Died for France (French: Morts pour la France), a historical tale about Senegalese skirmishers who fought for France during World War II. In his 1984 book The Supreme Guide's Early Retirement (La retraite Anticipée du Guide Suprême), he criticized the dictatorial regimes that followed the independence of many African countries.

In 1988, he published AIDS Control Certificate (Certificat de Contrôle Anti-Sida), a novel about a teenage girl whose father is accused of being HIV-positive. Adventure in Ottawa (L'Aventure à Ottawa), published in 1991, was his first novel aimed at a younger audience. Bilal the Prophet (Bilal le Prophète), another historical tale, was released in 1992, and The Revolt of the Galsénésiennes (La Révolte des Galsénésiennes), a tribute to women, followed in 1994.

In 1997, he published a complete study on Pan-Africanism. In 1999, he tackled the issue of forced marriage in his second young adult book.

Fakoly published Africa, the Rebirth (Afrique, la Renaissance), an essay that attempts to explain the causes of Africa's cultural alienation, in 2000. In 2003, he wrote an initiatory tale about Mali, Conquering the Magic Fountain, (A la conquête de la fontaine magique).

Beliefs
Doumbi-Fakoly believes that the rebirth of Africa is only possible if the Black-African people (and descendants) go back to their ancestral Black-African Spirituality. According to him, the Abrahamic religions (Judaism, Christianity and Islam) have negative consequences for the Black-African people (and descendants).

Bibliography
 Morts pour la France, 1983 (Karthala, Paris).
 La retraite Anticipée du Guide Suprême, 1984 (l'Harmattan, Paris)
 Certificat de Contrôle Anti-Sida, 1988 (Publisud, Paris)
 Aventure à Ottawa, 1991 (Hurtubise, Montreal)
 Bilal le Prophète, 1992 (Panafrica Plus, Ottawa)
 La Révolte des Galsénésiennes, 1994 (Publisud, Paris)
 Le Guide du Panafricaniste, 1997 (Editions Nouvelles du Sud, Paris)
 Un Mariage forcé 1999, (CEDA, Abidjan)
 Afrique, la Renaissance, 2000 (Publisud, Paris)
 A la conquête de la fontaine magique, 2003 (l’Harmattan, Paris)
 L’origine négro-africaine des religions dites révélées, 2004 Editions Menaibuc, Paris
 Introduction à la prière négro-africaine, 2005, Editions Menaibuc, Paris
 La Colonisation : L'autre crime contre l'humanité (le cas de la France coloniale), 2005, Editions Menaibuc, Paris
 Fakoly Prince du Mande, 2005, L'Harmattan, Paris
 L'origine biblique du racisme anti-noir, 2005, Editions Menaibuc, Paris
 Anta, grand prêtre d'Atum, 2005, Editions Menaibuc, Paris
 Cheikh Anta Diop Explique aux Adolescents, 2006, Editions Menaibuc, Paris
 Horus, fils d'Isis : (Le mythe d'Osiris expliqué), 2006, Editions Menaibuc, Paris
 La Bible en proces, 2008, Editions Menaibuc, Paris 
 Ces Dieux et Ces Egrégores Etrangers Qui Tuent le Peuple Noir, 2008, Editions Menaibuc, Paris
 Les chemins de La Maât, 2008, Editions Menaibuc, Paris
 Marcus Garvey expliqué aux adolescents, 2009, Editions Menaibuc, Paris
 L'Islam est-il une religion pour les Noirs ?, 2009, Editions Menaibuc, Paris
 An Introduction to How Black-African People should Pray, 2009, English traduction from Prof. Emmanuel Cadet, Editions Menaibuc, Paris

References

External links 

 Site Doumbi-Fakoly
 Site Afribone Mali
 Site Editions Menaibuc
 Site Blog Menaibuc
 Site AfricaMaat

1944 births
Living people
Malian writers
People from Kita, Mali
21st-century Malian people